Lely Resort is a census-designated place (CDP) in Collier County, Florida, United States. The population was 4,646 at the 2010 census, up from 1,426 in 2000. It is part of the Naples–Marco Island Metropolitan Statistical Area. In  2017, the population was 4,646.

History and development
Lely Resort was named after Cornelius van der Lely, a Dutch inventor. He bought around 25,000 acres of undeveloped land in 1972 with a plan to develop a community with more than 10,500 homes.  Although three planned golf courses were built in 1990, 1991 and 1997, the development stalled until Stock Development purchased 340 acres in the southern half of Lely Resort in 2001.

Geography
Lely Resort is located in western Collier County at  (26.081014, -81.700776). It is bordered to the southwest by U.S. Route 41, to the west by Naples Manor, to the northwest by Lely, and to the east by Verona Walk.

Demographics

2020 census

As of the 2020 United States census, there were 7,619 people, 2,993 households, and 1,754 families residing in the CDP.

2000 census
At the 2000 census, there were 1,426 people, 649 households and 445 families residing in the CDP. The racial makeup of the CDP was 89.27% White, 4.63% African American, 0.49% Asian, 0.14% Pacific Islander, 1.89% from other races, and 3.58% from two or more races. Hispanic or Latino of any race were 16.48% of the population.

There were 649 households, of which 19.1% had children under the age of 18 living with them, 56.1% were married couples living together, 8.3% had a female householder with no husband present, and 31.4% were non-families. 23.1% of all households were made up of individuals, and 8.3% had someone living alone who was 65 years of age or older  The average household size was 2.20 and the average family size was 2.53.

16.1% of the population were under the age of 18, 10.6% from 18 to 24, 20.8% from 25 to 44, 29.1% from 45 to 64, and 23.4% who were 65 years of age or older. The median age was 48 years. For every 100 females, there were 103.4 males. For every 100 females age 18 and over, there were 99.3 males.

The median household income was $50,640 and the median family income was $57,273. Males had a median income of $31,750 and females $25,560. The per capita income was $33,536. About 2.4% of families and 6.9% of the population were below the poverty line, including none of those under age 18 and 5.3% of those age 65 or over.

References

https://suburbanstats.org/population/florida/how-many-people-live-in-lely-resort

Census-designated places in Collier County, Florida
Census-designated places in Florida